The 1860–61 United States House of Representatives elections were held on various dates in various states between August 6, 1860 and October 24, 1861, before or after the first session of the 37th United States Congress convened on July 4, 1861. The number of House seats initially increased to 239 when California was apportioned an extra one, but these elections were affected by the outbreak of the American Civil War and resulted in over 56 vacancies.

In November 1860, Republican Abraham Lincoln won the Presidency. Though Republicans lost seats, the party won a House majority anyway as seven slave states reacted to Lincoln's election by seceding before the Presidential inauguration. These seceding states formed the Confederacy in February 1861 while withdrawing many Representatives and Senators from Congress, almost all Democrats.  As both sides in the impending American Civil War initially mobilized troops, another four slave states seceded by May 1861 in response to Lincoln's policy of using Federal force to defend Federal property and to coerce the seven initially seceding states.  The four remaining slave states did not secede, electing and returning Representatives normally.

Unionist regions of three seceding states returned ten Representatives: five from western Virginia, three from eastern Tennessee, and two from southern Louisiana.  Except for a tiny minority of outspoken Democrats, all Representatives supported the Union. Representatives opposing Democrats but unwilling to identify as Republican, particularly from slave states and including some remaining nativist American Party members, coalesced as the Unionist Party. In coalition with the Unionists, Republicans commanded over a two-thirds House supermajority.

Election summaries
California was apportioned one additional seat for the 37th Congress, increasing the total seats to 239.

Representatives from seceding states overwhelmingly were Democrats. Withdrawal of these Representatives boosted Republican House control. Some seceding states held Federal elections, but seceded before the elected Representatives served. Other seceding states held no Federal elections.

Special elections 

There were special elections in 1860–61 during the 36th United States Congress and 37th United States Congress.

36th Congress 

|-
! 
| Francis P. Blair Jr.
|  | Republican
| 18561858 1860 
|  | Incumbent resigned June 25, 1860.New member elected October 3, 1860.Democratic gain.Winner lost election to the next term, see below.
| nowrap | 

|-
! 
| John Schwartz
|  | Anti-Lecompton Democratic
| 1858
|  | Incumbent died June 20, 1860.New member elected October 9, 1860.Democratic hold.Winner was not a candidate for election to the next term.
| nowrap | 

|-
! 
| Israel Washburn Jr.
|  | Republican
| 1850
|  | Incumbent resigned January 1, 1861 to become Governor of Maine.New member elected November 6, 1860.Republican hold.Winner was not a candidate for election to the next term.
| nowrap | 

|-
! 
| Silas M. Burroughs
|  | Republican
| 1856
|  | Incumbent died June 3, 1860.New member elected November 6, 1860.Republican hold.
| nowrap | 

|}

37th Congress 

|-
! 
| Thomas Corwin
|  | Republican
| 1858
|  | Incumbent resigned March 12, 1861 to become U.S. Minister to Mexico.New member elected May 28, 1861.Unionist gain.Winner seated July 4, 1861.
| nowrap | 

|-
! 
| John Sherman
|  | Republican
| 1854
|  | Incumbent resigned March 12, 1861 to become U.S. Senator.New member elected May 28, 1861.Republican hold.Winner seated July 4, 1861.
| nowrap | 

|-
! 
| Charles F. Adams Sr.
|  | Republican
| 1858
|  | Incumbent resigned May 1, 1861 to become Ambassador to Great Britain.New member elected June 11, 1861.Unionist gain.
| nowrap | 

|-
! 
| Edward Joy Morris
|  | Republican
| 1856
|  | Incumbent resigned June 8, 1861 to become U.S. Minister Resident to Turkey.New member elected June 21, 1861.Democratic gain.Winner seated July 2, 1861.
| nowrap | 

|-
! 
| George W. Scranton
|  | Republican
| 1858
|  | Incumbent died March 24, 1861.New member elected June 21, 1861.Democratic gain.Winner seated July 4, 1861.
| nowrap | 

|-
! 
| Samuel Curtis
|  | Republican
| 1856
|  | Incumbent resigned August 4, 1861 to become colonel of the 2nd Iowa Infantry.New member elected October 8, 1861.Republican hold.
| nowrap | 

|-
! 
| John S. Carlile
|  | Unioinist
| 1859
|  | Incumbent resigned July 9, 1861 to become United States Senator from the loyal faction of Virginia.New member elected October 24, 1861.Unionist hold.Winner took his seat December 2, 1861.
| nowrap | 

|-
! 
| William Appleton
|  | Constitutional Unioinist
| 18501854 1860
|  | Incumbent resigned September 27, 1861 due to failing health.New member elected November 5, 1861.Republican gain.Winner seated December 2, 1861.
| nowrap | 

|-
! 
| John A. McClernand
|  | Democratic
| 1859 
|  | Incumbent resigned October 28, 1861 to accept a commission as brigadier general of volunteers for service in the Civil War.New member elected December 12, 1861.Democratic gain.
| nowrap | 

|}

Impact of the secessionist movement

In the wake of the declared secession of South Carolina from the Union on December 20, 1860, many Southern House members, mostly Democrats, refused to take their seats. Before 1872, different states held elections at various times; the first elections for the 37th Congress were held on August 6, 1860, in Arkansas and Missouri, while the last election took place in California on September 4, 1861, a year later. Three Southern states – Arkansas, Florida, and South Carolina – chose Representatives before the presidential election, electing seven Democrats and two independents. These were the only House elections from the seceding states to the 37th Congress. After South Carolina resolved disunion and the Confederate States of America was formed, other Southern states declared as well and elected Representatives to the new Congress of the Confederate States instead of the United States Congress.

Since the states not holding elections had many strong Democratic districts – in the previous 36th Congress their Representatives included a total of 46 Democrats, 14 Oppositionists, five independents, and one member of the American Party – when Congress was called into session on July 4, 1861 (five months earlier than usual at the time) the size of the Democratic House caucus had been drastically reduced, resulting in a huge Republican majority.

Of the 183 seats, 102 were held by Republicans, 45 by Democrats, 23 by Unionists, and five others by one party each. There were several vacancies, and California had not held its election when Congress assembled.

End of a Congressional era

In 1860, Lincoln's campaign brought the Republicans the Presidency. Likewise, the congressional elections also marked the transition from one major era of political parties to another. In just six years, over the course of the 35th, 36th–th Congresses, a complete reversal of party fortunes swamped the Democrats.

Elections for Congress were held from August 1860 to June 1861. They were held before, during and after the pre-determined Presidential campaign. And they were held before, during and after the secessionist campaigns in various states as they were reported throughout the country. Political conditions varied hugely from time to time during the course of congressional selection, but they had been shifting to a considerable extent in the years running up to the crisis.

In the 1856 elections, the Democrats had taken the Presidency for the sixth time in the last 40 years, with James Buchanan's victory over John C. Fremont and Millard Fillmore. They held almost a two-thirds majority in both the US House and Senate. Democrats held onto the Senate during the midterm elections, but the four opposition parties then amounted to two-thirds of the House. The congressional elections in 1860 transformed Democratic fortunes: Republican and Unionist candidates won a two-thirds majority in both House and Senate.

After the secessionist withdrawal, resignation and expulsion, the Democrats would have less than 25% of the House for the 37th Congress, and that minority divided further between pro-unionists (Stephen Douglas), and anti-war (Clement Vallandingham) factions.

Results by region 

The politics of these elections were distinctive in every region of the country. The more conventional listing of Members in their state delegations, alphabetically by state, can be found in the 37th Congress article.

Each Region below lists the states composing it using Freehling's descriptions from 1860. The Representative's biographies are linked at their names. Each congressional district has a link, named by its state abbreviation and its assigned number or noted At-large election. In a time before the Census Department published aggregate population data by congressional district, the reader may have ready access to census data identifying the makeup of those each district by referring to their respective articles.

The articles use different formats. The constituent counties of congressional districts are sometimes listed in a content heading "List of representatives" within tables. These tables have a column naming the District's counties for each election, such as (a) "District Area" for Massachusetts, or (b) "Area" for Illinois and Maryland. Virginia uses "Historical composition of the district" to describe composition at each reapportionment. Pennsylvania notes the home county of the elected representative, sometimes holding the largest population for respective districts. Minnesota makes a geographical allusion for its 1st District applicable to the 37th Congress. Michigan uses "History" since 1852 for its 4th district. In some states, previous district composition is not described.

New England 

Connecticut — Maine — Massachusetts — New Hampshire — Rhode Island — Vermont

The twenty-nine seats in the House among these six states are divided 24 Republican, two Union one Constitutional Union, and two Democratic. The region is important nationally in manufacturing and intellectually as the center of literature, Transcendentalism and the abolition movement.

North Central 

New Jersey — New York

The 38 Representatives from this region would seat 25 Republicans and thirteen Democrats. This region had the closest commercial and social ties to the South due to its sea-going commerce and trans-shipping cotton to local textile plants and for export.

Border North 

Illinois — Indiana — Michigan — Ohio — Pennsylvania — Wisconsin

The 73 seats in this region were split 50 Republican, 23 Democratic. Illinois is the only state here with more Democrats than Republicans.

These are free-soil states, north of the Mason–Dixon line. These states had either abolished slavery, or Congress had forbidden it in their Territory, and they had forbidden it at the beginning of their statehood.

Border South and Middle South 

Delaware — Kentucky — Maryland — Missouri — Tennessee — Virginia

Of the 47 Representatives in these six states, 24 are Union Party, 1 Constitutional Union, 6 Democratic,– would be vacant in Virginia and Tennessee.

These were "slaveholding" states, all south of the Mason–Dixon line. The border south states had less than 2% to more than 19% of their 1860 population held as slaves, with an average of 13%; middle south states ranged from 25-33% slaves, with an average of 29%. (Deep South 43-57%, except Texas, with 30%.)

Eight seats in Virginia and seven seats in Tennessee represented large numbers of citizens resisting the Lincoln administration of the United States government during the Civil War. They were declared vacant in 37th Congress documents.

Trans-Mississippi West 

California — Iowa — Kansas — Minnesota — Oregon — Non-voting members

West of the Mississippi, there were 16 Representatives from states, and 9 Delegates from territories. The states elected nine Republicans and one Democrat. The Territories elected four Republicans, one Democrat and two Independents.

When California entered the Union, it broke the free soil - slave state tie in the Senate. Minnesota, and Oregon followed as free-soil states. Once Congress was depleted of the secessionist Democrats, the lame-duck 36th Congress admitted Kansas as a free state in January 1861, in time for it to send a Representative to the 37th Congress in March. The Republican Congress elected in 1860 began funding the transcontinental railroad, in July 1862. Nevada was admitted before the end of the Civil War in the next, 38th, Congress.

Vacant state delegations 

Alabama — Arkansas — Florida — Georgia — Louisiana — Mississippi — North Carolina — South Carolina — Texas

Forty-three seats represented large numbers of citizens in nine states resisting the Lincoln administration of the United States government during the Civil War. The following state delegations were entirely vacated.

Missouri, Kentucky, Tennessee and Virginia are accounted for in the "Border South and Middle South" section.

Alabama 

Alabama did not elect members to the House.

|-
! 
| James Stallworth
|  | Democratic
| 1857
|  | Incumbent withdrew January 12, 1861.No member elected.Democratic loss.
| None.

|-
! 
| James L. Pugh
|  | Democratic
| 1859
|  | Incumbent withdrew January 12, 1861.No member elected.Democratic loss.
| None.

|-
! 
| David Clopton
|  | Democratic
| 1859
|  | Incumbent withdrew January 21, 1861.No member elected.Democratic loss.
| None.

|-
! 
| Sydenham Moore
|  | Democratic
| 1857
|  | Incumbent withdrew January 21, 1861.No member elected.Democratic loss.
| None.

|-
! 
| George S. Houston
|  | Democratic
| 1851
|  | Incumbent withdrew January 21, 1861.No member elected.Democratic loss.
| None.

|-
! 
| Williamson Cobb
|  | Democratic
| 1847
|  | Incumbent withdrew January 30, 1861.No member elected.Democratic loss.
| None.

|-
! 
| Jabez L. M. Curry
|  | Democratic
| 1857
|  | Incumbent withdrew January 21, 1861.No member elected.Democratic loss.
| None.

|}

Arkansas 

Arkansas elected its members on August 6, 1860.

|-
! 
| Thomas C. Hindman
|  | Democratic
| 1858
| Incumbent re-elected.Seat later vacated.
| nowrap | 

|-
! 
| Albert Rust
|  | Democratic
| 1858
|  | Incumbent retired.New member elected.Independent gain.Seat later vacated.
| nowrap | 

|}

California 

From statehood to 1864, California's representatives were elected at large, with the top two vote-getters winning the election from 1849 to 1858. In the 1860 Census, California gained a seat in the House.

California elected its members on September 4, 1861, after the first session of the new Congress began.

The top three vote-getters were elected, but only the top two were seated at the beginning of the session. When Congress later authorized California the third seat, Frederick Low was seated June 3, 1862.

|-
! 
| John C. Burch
|  | Democratic
| 1859
|  | Incumbent retired.New member elected.Republican gain.
| nowrap rowspan=3 | 

|-
! 
| Charles L. Scott
|  | Democratic
| 1856
|  | Incumbent retired.New member elected.Republican gain.

|-
! 
| colspan=3 | New seat created
|  | New seat.New member elected.Republican gain.

|}

Colorado Territory 
See non-voting delegates, below.

Connecticut 

Connecticut elected its members on April 1, 1861, after the new term began but before Congress convened.

|-
! 
| Dwight Loomis
|  | Republican
| 1859
| Incumbent re-elected.
| nowrap | 

|-
! 
| John Woodruff
|  | Republican
| 18551856 (Lost re-election)1859
|  | Unknown if incumbent retired or lost re-election.New member elected.Democratic gain.
| nowrap | 

|-
! 
| Alfred A. Burnham
|  | Republican
| 1859
| Incumbent re-elected.
| nowrap | 

|-
! 
| Orris S. Ferry
|  | Republican
| 1859
|  | Incumbent lost re-election.New member elected.Democratic gain.
| nowrap | 

|}

Dakota Territory 
See non-voting delegates, below.

Delaware 

Delaware elected its member on November 6, 1860 Election Day.

|-
! 
| William G. Whiteley
|  | Democratic
| 1856
|  | Incumbent retired.New member elected.People's gain.
| nowrap | 

|}

Florida 

Florida elected its member on October 1, 1860.

|-
! 
| George S. Hawkins
|  | Democratic
| 1856
|  | Incumbent retired.New member elected.Democratic hold.Seat later vacated.
| nowrap | 

|}

Georgia 

Georgia did not elect members to the House.

|-
! 
| Peter Early Love
|  | Democratic
| 1859
|  | Incumbent resigned January 23, 1861.No member elected.Democratic loss.
| None.

|-
! 
| Martin J. Crawford
|  | Democratic
| 1855
|  | Incumbent withdrew January 23, 1861.No member elected.Democratic loss.
| None.

|-
! 
| Thomas Hardeman Jr.
|  | Opposition
| 1859
|  | Incumbent withdrew January 23, 1861.No member elected.Opposition loss.
| None.

|-
! 
| Lucius J. Gartrell
|  | Democratic
| 1857
|  | Incumbent resigned January 23, 1861.No member elected.Democratic loss.
| None.

|-
! 
| John W. H. Underwood
|  | Democratic
| 1859
|  | Incumbent withdrew January 23, 1861.No member elected.Democratic loss.
| None.

|-
! 
| James Jackson
|  | Democratic
| 1857
|  | Incumbent resigned January 23, 1861.No member elected.Democratic loss.
| None.

|-
! 
| Joshua Hill
|  | Know Nothing
| 1857
|  | Incumbent withdrew January 23, 1861.No member elected.Know Nothing loss.
| None.

|-
! 
| John J. Jones
|  | Democratic
| 1857
|  | Incumbent withdrew January 23, 1861.No member elected.Democratic loss.
| None.

|}

Illinois 

Illinois elected its members on November 6, 1860 Election Day.

|-
! 
| Elihu B. Washburne
|  | Republican
| 1852
| Incumbent re-elected.
| nowrap | 

|-
! 
| John F. Farnsworth
|  | Republican
| 1856
|  | Incumbent retired.New member elected.Republican hold.
| nowrap | 

|-
! 
| Owen Lovejoy
|  | Republican
| 1856
| Incumbent re-elected.
| nowrap | 

|-
! 
| William Kellogg
|  | Republican
| 1856
| Incumbent re-elected.
| nowrap | 

|-
! 
| Isaac N. Morris
|  | Democratic
| 1856
|  | Incumbent retired.New member elected.Democratic hold.
| nowrap | 

|-
! 
| John A. McClernand
|  | Democratic
| 1859 
| Incumbent re-elected.
| nowrap | 

|-
! 
| James C. Robinson
|  | Democratic
| 1858
| Incumbent re-elected.
| nowrap | 

|-
! 
| Philip B. Fouke
|  | Democratic
| 1858
| Incumbent re-elected.
| nowrap | 

|-
! 
| John A. Logan
|  | Democratic
| 1858
| Incumbent re-elected.
| nowrap | 

|}

Indiana 

Indiana elected its members on October 9, 1860.

|-
! 
| William E. Niblack
|  | Democratic
| 1857
|  | Incumbent retired.New member elected.Democratic hold.
| nowrap | 

|-
! 
| William H. English
|  | Democratic
| 1858
|  | Incumbent retired.New member elected.Democratic hold.
| nowrap | 

|-
! 
| William M. Dunn
|  | Republican
| 1858
| Incumbent re-elected.
| nowrap | 

|-
! 
| William S. Holman
|  | Democratic
| 1858
| Incumbent re-elected.
| nowrap | 

|-
! 
| David Kilgore
|  | Republican
| 1858
|  | Incumbent retired.New member elected.Republican hold.
| nowrap | 

|-
! 
| Albert G. Porter
|  | Republican
| 1858
| Incumbent re-elected.
| nowrap | 

|-
! 
| John G. Davis
|  | Anti-Lecompton Democrat
| 1858
|  | Incumbent retired.New member elected.Democratic hold.
| nowrap | 

|-
! 
| James Wilson
|  | Republican
| 1858
|  | Incumbent retired.New member elected.Republican hold.
| nowrap | 

|-
! 
| Schuyler Colfax
|  | Republican
| 1858
| Incumbent re-elected.
| nowrap | 

|-
! 
| Charles Case
|  | Republican
| 1858
|  | Incumbent retired.New member elected.Republican hold.
| nowrap | 

|-
! 
| John U. Pettit
|  | Republican
| 1856
|  | Incumbent retired.New member elected.Republican hold.
| nowrap | 

|}

Iowa 

Iowa elected its members on October 9, 1860.

|-
! 
| Samuel R. Curtis
|  | Republican
| 1856
| Incumbent re-elected.
| nowrap | 

|-
! 
| William Vandever
|  | Republican
| 1858
| Incumbent re-elected.
| nowrap | 

|}

Kansas 

Kansas elected its member on December 1, 1859.

|-
! 
| Martin F. Conway
|  | Republican
| 1859 
| State admitted January 29, 1861, just in time for the elected Representative to take his seat in the new Congress, beginning March 4, 1861.
| nowrap | 

|}

Kentucky 

Kansas elected its members on June 20, 1861, after the new term began but before Congress convened.

|-
! 
| Henry C. Burnett
|  | Democratic
| 1855
| Incumbent re-elected.
| nowrap | 

|-
! 
| Samuel Peyton
|  | Democratic
| 1857
|  | Incumbent lost renomination.New member elected.Unionist gain.
| nowrap | 

|-
! 
| Francis Bristow
|  | Opposition
| 1854 1855 1859
|  | Incumbent retired.New member elected.Unionist gain.
| nowrap | 

|-
! 
| William C. Anderson
|  | Opposition
| 1859
|  | Incumbent retired.New member elected.Unionist gain.
| nowrap | 

|-
! 
| John Y. Brown
|  | Democratic
| 1859
|  | Unknown if incumbent retired or lost re-election.New member elected.Unionist gain.
| nowrap | 

|-
! 
| George W. Dunlap
|  | Opposition
| 18471849 1859
|  | Incumbent retired.New member elected.Unionist gain.
| nowrap | 

|-
! 
| Robert Mallory
|  | Opposition
| 1859
|  | Incumbent re-elected in a new party.Unionist gain.
| nowrap | 

|-
! 
| William E. Simms
|  | Democratic
| 1859
|  | Incumbent lost re-election.New member elected.Unionist gain.
| nowrap | 

|-
! 
| Laban T. Moore
|  | Opposition
| 1859
|  | Incumbent retired.New member elected.Unionist gain.
| nowrap | 

|-
! 
| John W. Stevenson
|  | Democratic
| 1857
|  | Incumbent lost re-election.New member elected.Unionist gain.
| nowrap | 

|}

Louisiana 

Louisiana seceded on January 26, 1861, and did not elect members of the 37th Congress.

|-
! 
| John Edward Bouligny
|  | Know Nothing
| 1859
|  | No member elected.Know Nothing loss.
| None.

|-
! 
| Miles Taylor
|  | Democratic
| 1855
|  | Incumbent withdrew February 5, 1861.No member elected.Democratic loss.
| None.

|-
! 
| Thomas G. Davidson
|  | Democratic
| 1855
|  | No member elected.Democratic loss.
| None.

|-
! 
| John M. Landrum
|  | Democratic
| 1859
|  | Incumbent retired.No member elected.Democratic loss.
| None.

|}

Maine 

Maine elected its members on September 10, 1860.

|-
! 
| Daniel E. Somes
|  | Republican
| 1858
|  | Incumbent retired.New member elected.Republican hold.
| nowrap | 

|-
! 
| John J. Perry
|  | Republican
| 1854
|  | Incumbent retired.New member elected.Republican hold.
| nowrap | 

|-
! 
| Ezra B. French
|  | Republican
| 1858
|  | Incumbent retired.New member elected.Republican hold.
| nowrap | 

|-
! 
| Freeman H. Morse
|  | Republican
| 1856
|  | Incumbent retired.New member elected.Republican hold.
| nowrap | 

|-
! 
| Israel Washburn Jr.
|  | Republican
| 1850
|  | Incumbent retired to run for Governor of Maine.New member elected.Republican hold.
| nowrap | 

|-
! 
| Stephen C. Foster
|  | Republican
| 1856
|  | Incumbent retired.New member elected.Republican hold.
| nowrap | 

|}

Maryland 

Maryland elected its members on June 13, 1861, after the new term began but before Congress convened.

|-
! 
| James A. Stewart
|  | Democratic
| 1855
|  | Incumbent retired.New member elected.Unionist gain.
| nowrap | 

|-
! 
| Edwin H. Webster
|  | Know Nothing
| 1859
|  | Incumbent re-elected in a new party.Unionist gain.
| nowrap | 

|-
! 
| James M. Harris
|  | Know Nothing
| 1855
|  | Incumbent retired.New member elected.Unionist gain.
| nowrap | 

|-
! 
| Henry W. Davis
|  | Know Nothing
| 1855
|  | Incumbent lost re-election.New member elected.Unionist gain.
| nowrap | 

|-
! 
| Jacob M. Kunkel
|  | Democratic
| 1857
|  | Incumbent retired.New member elected.Unionist gain.
| nowrap | 

|-
! 
| George W. Hughes
|  | Democratic
| 1859
|  | Incumbent retired.New member elected.Unionist gain.
| nowrap | 

|}

Massachusetts 

Massachusetts elected its members on November 6, 1860 Election Day.

|-
! 
| Thomas D. Eliot
|  | Republican
| 1858
| Incumbent re-elected.
| nowrap | 

|-
! 
| James Buffington
|  | Republican
| 1854
| Incumbent re-elected.
| nowrap | 

|-
! 
| Charles Francis Adams Sr.
|  | Republican
| 1858
| Incumbent re-elected.
| nowrap | 

|-
! 
| Alexander H. Rice
|  | Republican
| 1858
| Incumbent re-elected.
| nowrap | 

|-
! 
| Anson Burlingame
|  | Republican
| 1854
|  | Incumbent lost re-election.New member elected.Constitutional Union gain.
| nowrap | 

|-
! 
| John B. Alley
|  | Republican
| 1858
| Incumbent re-elected.
| nowrap | 

|-
! 
| Daniel W. Gooch
|  | Republican
| 1858
| Incumbent re-elected.
| nowrap | 

|-
! 
| Charles R. Train
|  | Republican
| 1859
| Incumbent re-elected.
| nowrap | 

|-
! 
| Eli Thayer
|  | Constitutional Union
| 1856
|  | Incumbent lost re-election.New member elected.Republican gain.
| nowrap | 

|-
! 
| Charles Delano
|  | Republican
| 1858
| Incumbent re-elected.
| nowrap | 

|-
! 
| Henry L. Dawes
|  | Republican
| 1856
| Incumbent re-elected.
| nowrap | 

|}

Michigan 

Michigan its members on the November 6, 1860 Election Day.

|-
! 
| William A. Howard
|  | Republican
| 1854
|  | Incumbent retired.New member elected.Republican hold.
| nowrap | 

|-
! 
| Henry Waldron
|  | Republican
| 1854
|  | Incumbent retired.New member elected.Republican hold.
| nowrap | 

|-
! 
| Francis W. Kellogg
|  | Republican
| 1858
| Incumbent re-elected.
| nowrap | 

|-
! 
| Dewitt C. Leach
|  | Republican
| 1858
|  | Incumbent retired.New member elected.Republican hold.
| nowrap | 

|}

Minnesota 

Minnesota elected its members on November 6, 1860 Election Day.

|-
! 
|  | Cyrus Aldrich (Republican)
| 1858
| Incumbent re-elected.
| rowspan=2 nowrap | 

|-
! 
|  | William Windom (Republican)
| 1858
| Incumbent re-elected.

|}

Mississippi 

Mississippi seceded on January 9, 1861, and did not elect members of the 37th Congress.

|-
! 
| Lucius Q. C. Lamar
|  | Democratic
| 1857
|  | Incumbent retired December 1860.No member elected.Democratic loss.
| None

|-
! 
| Reuben Davis
|  | Democratic
| 1857
|  | Incumbent withdrew January 12, 1861.No member elected.Democratic loss.
| None

|-
! 
| William Barksdale
|  | Democratic
| 1855
|  | Incumbent withdrew January 12, 1861.No member elected.Democratic loss.
| None

|-
! 
| Otho R. Singleton
|  | Democratic
| 1857
|  | Incumbent withdrew January 12, 1861.No member elected.Democratic loss.
| None

|-
! 
| John J. McRae
|  | Democratic
| 1858 (special)
|  | Incumbent withdrew January 12, 1861.No member elected.Democratic loss.
| None

|}

Missouri 

Missouri elected its members on September 10, 1860.

|-
! 
| John Richard Barret
|  | Democratic
| 1858
|  | Incumbent lost re-election.New member elected.Republican gain.
| nowrap | 

|-
! 
| Thomas L. Anderson
|  | Independent Democratic
| 1856
|  | Incumbent retired.New member elected.Constitutional Union gain.
| nowrap | 

|-
! 
| John Bullock Clark
|  | Democratic
| 1856
| Incumbent re-elected.
| nowrap | 

|-
! 
| James Craig
|  | Democratic
| 1856
|  | Incumbent lost renomination.New member elected.Democratic hold
| nowrap | 

|-
! 
| Samuel H. Woodson
|  | American
| 1856
|  | Incumbent retired.New member elected.Democratic gain.
| nowrap | 

|-
! 
| John S. Phelps
|  | Democratic
| 1844
| Incumbent re-elected.
| nowrap | 

|-
! 
| John William Noell
|  | Democratic
| 1858
| Incumbent re-elected.
| nowrap | 

|}

Nebraska Territory 
See non-voting delegates, below.

Nevada Territory 
See non-voting delegates, below.

New Hampshire 

New Hampshire elected its members on March 12, 1861, after the new term began but before Congress convened.

|-
! 
| Gilman Marston
|  | Republican
| 1859
| Incumbent re-elected.
| nowrap | 

|-
! 
| Mason Tappan
|  | Republican
| 1855
|  | Incumbent retired.New member elected.Republican hold.
| nowrap | 

|-
! 
| Thomas M. Edwards
|  | Republican
| 1859
| Incumbent re-elected.
| nowrap | 

|}

New Jersey 

New Jersey its members on the November 6, 1860 Election Day.

|-
! 
| John T. Nixon
|  | Republican
| 1858
| Incumbent re-elected.
| nowrap | 

|-
! 
| John L. N. Stratton
|  | Republican
| 1858
| Incumbent re-elected.
| nowrap | 

|-
! 
| Garnett Adrain
|  | Anti-Lecompton Democrat
| 1856
|  | Incumbent retired.New member elected.Democratic hold.
| nowrap | 

|-
! 
| Jetur R. Riggs
|  | Anti-Lecompton Democrat
| 1858
|  | Incumbent retired.New member elected.Democratic hold.
| nowrap | 

|-
! 
| William Pennington
|  | Republican
| 1858
|  | Incumbent lost re-election.New member elected.Democratic gain.
| nowrap | 

|}

New Mexico Territory 
See non-voting delegates, below.

New York 

New York its members on the November 6, 1860 Election Day.

|-
! 
| Luther C. Carter
|  | Republican
| 1858
|  | Incumbent lost re-election.New member elected.Democratic gain.
| nowrap | 

|-
! 
| James Humphrey
|  | Republican
| 1858
|  | Incumbent lost re-election.New member elected.Democratic gain.
| nowrap | 

|-
! 
| Daniel Sickles
|  | Democratic
| 1856
|  | Incumbent retired.New member elected.Democratic hold.
| nowrap | 

|-
! 
| Thomas J. Barr
|  | Independent Democratic
| 1858
|  | Incumbent retired.New member elected.Independent Democratic hold.
| nowrap | 

|-
! 
| William B. Maclay
|  | Democratic
| 1856
|  | Incumbent retired.New member elected.Republican gain.
| nowrap | 

|-
! 
| John Cochrane
|  | Democratic
| 1856
|  | Incumbent lost renomination.New member elected.Republican gain.
| nowrap | 

|-
! 
| George Briggs
|  | Republican
| 1858
|  | Incumbent retired.New member elected.Democratic gain.
| nowrap | 

|-
! 
| Horace F. Clark
|  | Anti-Lecompton Democratic
| 1856
|  | Incumbent retired.New member elected.Democratic hold.
| nowrap | 

|-
! 
| John B. Haskin
|  | Anti-Lecompton Democratic
| 1856
|  | Incumbent retired.New member elected.Democratic hold.
| nowrap | 

|-
! 
| Charles Van Wyck
|  | Republican
| 1858
| Incumbent re-elected.
| nowrap | 

|-
! 
| William S. Kenyon
|  | Republican
| 1858
|  | Incumbent retired.New member elected.Democratic gain.
| nowrap | 

|-
! 
| Charles Lewis Beale
|  | Republican
| 1858
|  | Incumbent retired.New member elected.Republican hold.
| nowrap | 

|-
! 
| Abram B. Olin
|  | Republican
| 1856
| Incumbent re-elected.
| nowrap | 

|-
! 
| John H. Reynolds
|  | Anti-Lecompton Democratic
| 1858
|  | Incumbent retired.New member elected.Democratic hold.
| nowrap | 

|-
! 
| James B. McKean
|  | Republican
| 1858
| Incumbent re-elected.
| nowrap | 

|-
! 
| George W. Palmer
|  | Republican
| 1856
|  | Incumbent retired.New member elected.Republican hold.
| nowrap | 

|-
! 
| Francis E. Spinner
|  | Republican
| 1854
|  | Incumbent retired.New member elected.Republican hold.
| nowrap | 

|-
! 
| Clark B. Cochrane
|  | Republican
| 1856
|  | Incumbent retired.New member elected.Democratic gain.
| nowrap | 

|-
! 
| James H. Graham
|  | Republican
| 1858
|  | Incumbent retired.New member elected.Republican hold.
| nowrap | 

|-
! 
| Roscoe Conkling
|  | Republican
| 1858
| Incumbent re-elected.
| nowrap | 

|-
! 
| R. Holland Duell
|  | Republican
| 1858
| Incumbent re-elected.
| nowrap | 

|-
! 
| M. Lindley Lee
|  | Republican
| 1858
|  | Incumbent retired.New member elected.Republican hold.
| nowrap | 

|-
! 
| Charles B. Hoard
|  | Republican
| 1856
|  | Incumbent retired.New member elected.Republican hold.
| nowrap | 

|-
! 
| Charles B. Sedgwick
|  | Republican
| 1858
| Incumbent re-elected.
| nowrap | 

|-
! 
| Martin Butterfield
|  | Republican
| 1858
|  | Incumbent retired.New member elected.Republican hold.
| nowrap | 

|-
! 
| Emory B. Pottle
|  | Republican
| 1856
|  | Incumbent retired.New member elected.Republican hold.
| nowrap | 

|-
! 
| Alfred Wells
|  | Republican
| 1858
|  | Incumbent retired.New member elected.Republican hold.
| nowrap | 

|-
! 
| William Irvine
|  | Republican
| 1858
|  | Incumbent retired.New member elected.Republican hold.
| nowrap | 

|-
! 
| Alfred Ely
|  | Republican
| 1858
| Incumbent re-elected.
| nowrap | 

|-
! 
| Augustus Frank
|  | Republican
| 1858
| Incumbent re-elected.
| nowrap | 

|-
! 
| Edwin R. Reynolds
|  | Republican
| 1860
|  | Incumbent retired.New member elected.Republican hold.
| nowrap | 

|-
! 
| Elbridge G. Spaulding
|  | Republican
| 1858
| Incumbent re-elected.
| nowrap | 

|-
! 
| Reuben Fenton
|  | Republican
| 1856
| Incumbent re-elected.
| nowrap | 

|}

North Carolina 

North Carolina seceded on May 20, 1861, and did not elect members of the 37th Congress.

|-
! 
| William N. H. Smith
|  | Opposition
| 1859
|  | Incumbent retired.No member elected.Opposition loss.
| None.

|-
! 
| Thomas H. Ruffin
|  | Democratic
| 1853
|  | Incumbent retired.No member elected.Democratic loss.
| None.

|-
! 
| Warren Winslow
|  | Democratic
| 1855
|  | Incumbent retired.No member elected.Democratic loss.
| None.

|-
! 
| Lawrence O'Bryan Branch
|  | Democratic
| 1855
|  | Incumbent retired.No member elected.Democratic loss.
| None.

|-
! 
| John A. Gilmer
|  | Opposition
| 1857
|  | Incumbent retired.No member elected.Opposition loss.
| None.

|-
! 
| James M. Leach
|  | Opposition
| 1859
|  | Incumbent retired.No member elected.Opposition loss.
| None.

|-
! 
| F. Burton Craige
|  | Democratic
| 1853
|  | Incumbent retired.No member elected.Democratic loss.
| None.

|-
! 
| Zebulon B. Vance
|  | Democratic
| 1858 
|  | Incumbent retired.No member elected.Democratic loss.
| None.

|}

Ohio 

|-
! 
| George H. Pendleton
|  | Democratic
| 1856
| Incumbent re-elected.
| nowrap | 

|-
! 
| John A. Gurley
|  | Republican
| 1858
| Incumbent re-elected.
| nowrap | 

|-
! 
| Clement Vallandigham
|  | Democratic
| 1858 
| Incumbent re-elected.
| nowrap | 

|-
! 
| William Allen
|  | Democratic
| 1858
| Incumbent re-elected.
| nowrap | 

|-
! 
| James M. Ashley
|  | Republican
| 1858
| Incumbent re-elected.
| nowrap | 

|-
! 
| William Howard
|  | Democratic
| 1858
|  | Incumbent retired.New member elected.Democratic hold.
| nowrap | 

|-
! 
| Thomas Corwin
|  | Republican
| 1858
| Incumbent re-elected.
| nowrap | 

|-
! 
| Benjamin Stanton
|  | Republican
| 1854
|  | Incumbent retired.New member elected.Republican hold.
| nowrap | 

|-
! 
| John Carey
|  | Republican
| 1858
|  | Incumbent lost re-election.New member elected.Democratic gain.
| nowrap | 

|-
! 
| Carey A. Trimble
|  | Republican
| 1858
| Incumbent re-elected.
| nowrap | 

|-
! 
| Charles D. Martin
|  | Democratic
| 1858
|  | Incumbent lost re-election.New member elected.Republican gain.
| nowrap | 

|-
! 
| Samuel S. Cox
|  | Democratic
| 1856
| Incumbent re-elected.
| nowrap | 

|-
! 
| John Sherman
|  | Republican
| 1854
| Incumbent re-elected.
| nowrap | 

|-
! 
| Harrison G. O. Blake
|  | Republican
| 
| Incumbent re-elected.
| nowrap | 

|-
! 
| William Helmick
|  | Republican
| 1858
|  | Incumbent lost re-election.New member elected.Democratic gain.
| nowrap | 

|-
! 
| Cydnor B. Tompkins
|  | Republican
| 1856
|  | Incumbent lost renomination.New member elected.Republican hold.
| nowrap | 

|-
! 
| Thomas C. Theaker
|  | Republican
| 1858
|  | Incumbent lost re-election.New member elected.Democratic gain.
| nowrap | 

|-
! 
| Sidney Edgerton
|  | Republican
| 1858
| Incumbent re-elected.
| nowrap | 

|-
! 
| Edward Wade
|  | Republican
| 1852
|  | Incumbent retired.New member elected.Republican hold.
| nowrap | 

|-
! 
| John Hutchins
|  | Republican
| 1858
| Incumbent re-elected.
| nowrap | 

|-
! 
| John A. Bingham
|  | Republican
| 1854
| Incumbent re-elected.
| nowrap | 

|}

Oregon 

Poorly coordinated state legislation created confusion. As a result, two elections were held in 1860: on June 4 (won by George K. Shiel and on November 6 (won by Andrew J. Thayer). Thayer was seated March 4, 1861, but Shiel contested the election. On July 30, 1861, the House Elections Committee seated the Shiel for the rest of the term ending March 3, 1863. Both disputants were Democrats.

|-
! rowspan=2 | 
| rowspan=2 | Lansing Stout
| rowspan=2  | Democratic
| rowspan=2 | 1858
|  | Incumbent lost renomination.New member elected June 4, 1860.Democratic hold.Winner successfully challenged the results of the other election and was seated July 30, 1861.
| nowrap | 

|-
|  | Incumbent lost renomination.New member elected November 6, 1860.Democratic hold.Winner was initially seated but later lost election challenge.
| nowrap | 

|}

Pennsylvania 

Pennsylvania elected its members on October 9, 1860.

|-
! 
| Thomas B. Florence
|  | Democratic
| 1848
|  | Incumbent retired.New member elected.Democratic hold.
| nowrap | 

|-
! 
| Edward J. Morris
|  | People's
| 1856
|  | Incumbent re-elected.Republican gain.
| nowrap | 

|-
! 
| John P. Verree
|  | People's
| 1858
|  | Incumbent re-elected.Republican gain.
| nowrap | 

|-
! 
| William Millward
|  | People's
| 1858
|  | Incumbent retired.New member elected.Republican gain.
| nowrap | 

|-
! 
| John Wood
|  | People's
| 1858
|  | Incumbent retired.New member elected.Republican gain.
| nowrap | 

|-
! 
| John Hickman
|  | Democratic
| 1856
|  | Incumbent re-elected.Republican gain.
| nowrap | 

|-
! 
| Thomas Corwin
|  | Republican
| 1858
| Incumbent re-elected.
| nowrap | 

|-
! 
| Jacob K. McKenty
|  | Democratic
| 1860
|  | Incumbent retired.New member elected.Democratic hold.
| nowrap | 

|-
! 
| Thaddeus Stevens
|  | People's
| 1858
|  | Incumbent re-elected.Republican gain.
| nowrap | 

|-
! 
| John W. Killinger
|  | People's
| 1858
|  | Incumbent re-elected.Republican gain.
| nowrap | 

|-
! 
| James H. Campbell
|  | People's
| 1858
|  | Incumbent re-elected.Republican gain.
| nowrap | 

|-
! 
| George W. Scranton
|  | People's
| 1858
|  | Incumbent re-elected.Republican gain.
| nowrap | 

|-
! 
| William H. Dimmick
|  | Democratic
| 1856
|  | Incumbent retired.New member elected.Democratic hold.
| nowrap | 

|-
! 
| Galusha A. Grow
|  | People's
| 1850
|  | Incumbent re-elected.Republican gain.
| nowrap | 

|-
! 
| James Tracy Hale
|  | People's
| 1858
|  | Incumbent re-elected.Republican gain.
| nowrap | 

|-
! 
| Benjamin F. Junkin
|  | People's
| 1858
|  | Incumbent lost re-election.New member elected.Democratic gain.
| nowrap | 

|-
! 
| Edward McPherson
|  | People's
| 1858
|  | Incumbent re-elected.Republican gain.
| nowrap | 

|-
! 
| Samuel S. Blair
|  | People's
| 1858
|  | Incumbent re-elected.Republican gain.
| nowrap | 

|-
! 
| John Covode
|  | People's
| 1854
|  | Incumbent re-elected.Republican gain.
| nowrap | 

|-
! 
| William Montgomery
|  | Democratic
| 1856
|  | Incumbent retired.New member elected.Democratic hold.
| nowrap | 

|-
! 
| James K. Moorhead
|  | People's
| 1858
|  | Incumbent re-elected.Republican gain.
| nowrap | 

|-
! 
| Robert McKnight
|  | People's
| 1858
|  | Incumbent re-elected.Republican gain.
| nowrap | 

|-
! 
| William Stewart
|  | People's
| 1856
|  | Incumbent retired.New member elected.Republican gain.
| nowrap | 

|-
! 
| Chapin Hall
|  | People's
| 1858
|  | Incumbent retired.New member elected.Republican gain.
| nowrap | 

|-
! 
| Elijah Babbitt
|  | People's
| 1858
|  | Incumbent re-elected.Republican gain.
| nowrap | 

|}

Rhode Island 

Rhode Island elected its members April 3, 1861, after the new term began but before Congress convened..

|-
! 
| Christopher Robinson
|  | Republican
| 1859
|  | Incumbent lost re-election.New member elected.Unionist gain.
| nowrap | 

|-
! 
| William D. Brayton
|  | Republican
| 1859
|  | Incumbent lost re-election.New member elected.Unionist gain.
| nowrap | 

|}

South Carolina 

South Carolina its members October 8–9, 1860.

|-
! 
| John McQueen
|  | Democratic
| 1844
| Incumbent re-elected.Seat later vacated.
| nowrap | 

|-
! 
| William P. Miles
|  | Democratic
| 1856
| Incumbent re-elected.Seat later vacated.
| nowrap | 

|-
! 
| Laurence M. Keitt
|  | Democratic
| 1853
|  |Incumbent retired.New member elected.Democratic hold.Seat later vacated.
| nowrap | 

|-
! 
| Milledge L. Bonham
|  | Democratic
| 1858
| Incumbent re-elected.Seat later vacated.
| nowrap | 

|-
! 
| John D. Ashmore
|  | Democratic
| 1858
| Incumbent re-elected.Seat later vacated.
| nowrap | 

|-
! 
| William W. Boyce
|  | Democratic
| 1853
| Incumbent re-elected.Seat later vacated.
| nowrap | 

|}

Tennessee 

Tennessee elected its members August 1, 1861, but only in East Tennessee, after the first session of the new Congress began.

|-
! 
| Thomas A. R. Nelson
|  | Opposition
| 1859
|  | Incumbent re-elected as a Unionist but failed to be seated.Unionist gain.Winner was prevented from taking his seat by his arrest.
| nowrap | 

|-
! 
| Horace Maynard
|  | Opposition
| 1857
|  | Incumbent re-elected as a Unionist.Unionist gain.
| nowrap | 

|-
! 
| Reese B. Brabson
|  | Opposition
| 1859
|  | Incumbent retired.New member elected.Unionist gain.Winner was prevented from taking his seat by his arrest.
| nowrap | 

|-
! 
| William B. Stokes
|  | Democratic
| 1859
|  | Unknown if incumbent retired or lost.New member elected.Unionist gain.
| nowrap | 

|-
! 
| Robert H. Hatton
|  | Opposition
| 1859
|  | Unknown if incumbent retired or lost.No member elected.Opposition loss.
| None.

|-
! 
| James H. Thomas
|  | Opposition
| 1859
|  | Unknown if incumbent retired or lost.No member elected.Opposition loss.
| None.

|-
! 
| John V. Wright
|  | Democratic
| 1855
|  | Unknown if incumbent retired or lost.No member elected.Democratic loss.
| None.

|-
! 
| James M. Quarles
|  | Opposition
| 1859
|  | Incumbent retired.No member elected.Opposition loss.
| None.

|-
! 
| Emerson Etheridge
|  | Opposition
| 18531857 1859
|  | Unknown if incumbent retired or lost.No member elected.Opposition loss.
| None.

|-
! 
| William T. Avery
|  | Democratic
| 1857
|  | Incumbent retired.No member elected.Democratic loss.
| None.

|}

Texas 

Texas seceded on February 1, 1861, and did not elect members of the 37th Congress.

|-
! 
| John H. Reagan
|  | Democratic
| 1859
|  | Incumbent resigned January 15, 1861.No member elected.Democratic loss.
| None.

|-
! 
| Andrew J. Hamilton
|  | Independent Democratic
| 1859
|  | Incumbent retired.No member elected.Independent Democratic loss.
| None.

|}

Utah Territory 
See non-voting delegates, below.

Vermont 

Vermont its members September 4, 1860.

|-
! 
| Eliakim P. Walton
|  | Republican
| 1856
| Incumbent re-elected.
| nowrap | 

|-
! 
| Justin S. Morrill
|  | Republican
| 1854
| Incumbent re-elected.
| nowrap | 

|-
! 
| Homer E. Royce
|  | Republican
| 1856
|  | Incumbent retired.New member elected.Republican hold.
| nowrap | 

|}

Virginia 

Virginia its members October 24, 1861.

|-
! 
| Muscoe Garnett
|  | Democratic
| 1856 
|  | Incumbent retired.New member elected October 24, 1861.Unionist gain.Winner was later disqualified.
| nowrap | 

|-
! 
| John S. Millson
|  | Democratic
| 1853
|  | Incumbent retired.No member elected.Democratic loss.
| None.

|-
! 
| Daniel Coleman DeJarnette Sr.
|  | Independent Democratic
| 1853
|  | Incumbent retired.No member elected.Independent Democratic loss.
| None.

|-
! 
| Roger Pryor
|  | Democratic
| 1859 
|  | Incumbent retired.No member elected.Democratic loss.
| None.

|-
! 
| Thomas S. Bocock
|  | Democratic
| 1853
|  | Incumbent retired.No member elected.Democratic loss.
| None.

|-
! 
| Shelton F. Leake
|  | Independent Democratic
| 1859
|  | Incumbent retired.No member elected.Independent Democratic loss.
| None.

|-
! 
| William Smith
|  | Democratic
| 1841 1843 1857
|  | Incumbent retired.New member elected.Unionist gain.Winner was later disqualified.
| nowrap | 

|-
! 
| Alexander Boteler
|  | Opposition
| 1859
|  | Incumbent retired.No member elected.Opposition loss.
| None.

|-
! 
| John T. Harris
|  | Independent Democratic
| 1859
|  | Incumbent retired.No member elected.Independent Democratic loss.
| None.

|-
! 
| Sherrard Clemens
|  | Democratic
| 1857
|  | Incumbent retired.New member elected.Unionist gain.
| nowrap | 

|-
! 
| Albert G. Jenkins
|  | Democratic
| 1857
|  | Incumbent retired.New member elected.Unionist gain.
| nowrap | 

|-
! 
| Henry A. Edmundson
|  | Democratic
| 1849
|  | Incumbent retired.New member elected.Unionist gain.
| nowrap | 

|-
! 
| Elbert S. Martin
|  | Independent Democratic
| 1859
|  | Incumbent lost re-election.No member elected.Independent Democratic loss.
| None.

|}

Washington Territory 
See non-voting delegates, below.

Wisconsin 

Wisconsin its members on Election Day, November 6, 1860.

|-
! 
| John F. Potter
|  | Republican
| 1856
| Incumbent re-elected.
| nowrap | 

|-
! 
| Cadwallader C. Washburn
|  | Republican
| 1854
|  | Incumbent retired.New member elected.Republican hold.
| nowrap | 

|-
! 
| Charles H. Larrabee
|  | Democratic
| 1858
|  | Incumbent lost re-election.New member elected.Republican gain.
| nowrap | 

|}

Non-voting delegates 

All are trans-Mississippi west non-voting delegates in the 37th Congress.

|-
! 
| colspan=3 | New territory
|  | New seat.New delegate elected.Conservative Republican gain.
| nowrap | 

|-
! 
| colspan=3 | New territory
|  | New seat.New delegate elected.Democratic gain.
| nowrap | 

|-
! 
| Samuel Gordon Daily
|  | Republican
| 1860 
| Incumbent re-elected in 1862.
| nowrap | 

|-
! 
| colspan=3 | New territory
|  | New seat.New delegate elected.Independent gain.
| nowrap | 

|-
! 
| Miguel A. Otero
|  | Democratic
| 1859
|  | Incumbent retired.New delegate elected.Republican gain.
| nowrap | 

|-
! 
| William Henry Hooper
|  | Democratic
| 1858 or 1859
|  | Incumbent lost re-election.New delegate elected.Independent gain.
| nowrap | 

|-
! 
| Isaac Stevens
|  | Democratic
| 1856 or 1857
|  | Incumbent retired.New delegate elected.Republican gain.
| nowrap | 

|}

See also
 1860 United States elections
 1860 United States presidential election
 1860–61 United States Senate elections
 36th United States Congress
 37th United States Congress

Notes

References

Bibliography

External links
 Office of the Historian (Office of Art & Archives, Office of the Clerk, U.S. House of Representatives)